Chaetolepis is a genus of flowering plants belonging to the family Melastomataceae.

Its native range is Costa Rica to Guyana.

Species:

Chaetolepis alpina 
Chaetolepis anisandra 
Chaetolepis cufodontisii 
Chaetolepis lindeniana 
Chaetolepis loricarella 
Chaetolepis microphylla 
Chaetolepis perijensis 
Chaetolepis phelpsiae 
Chaetolepis santamartensis 
Chaetolepis sessilis

References

Melastomataceae
Melastomataceae genera
Taxa named by Augustin Pyramus de Candolle